Manlius Township may refer to the following places in the United States:

 Manlius Township, Bureau County, Illinois
 Manlius Township, LaSalle County, Illinois
 Manlius Township, Michigan

See also

 Manlius (disambiguation)

Township name disambiguation pages